The Berkshire Flyer is a seasonal Amtrak passenger train service between New York City and the Berkshire Mountains in Pittsfield, Massachusetts, via the Hudson Valley. The weekly train departs Penn Station on Friday afternoons during the summer and returns on Sundays. The route's inaugural season ran from July 8 to September 5, 2022, as part of a pilot program set to run through summer 2023.

History 

In 2014, Massachusetts proposed moving ahead with plans for commuter rail service between the Berkshires and New York City. Eight round trips per day would have followed the Housatonic Railroad from Pittsfield through Connecticut to Southeast, New York, where they would have taken the Harlem Line to Grand Central Terminal. Four stops were proposed in Berkshire County: Pittsfield, Lee, Great Barrington, and Sheffield. The commuter rail project failed to progress due to disinterest from the administration of Connecticut Governor Dannel Malloy.

In 2017, the Massachusetts legislature began new efforts toward a summer tourist train, not commuter rail, between New York City and the Berkshires. Eddie Sporn, a Berkshire-based consultant, was researching the topic of restoring passenger rail service and sent an outline of plans to State Senator Adam Hinds. The plan for the "Berkshire Flyer" was modeled on the CapeFLYER, a popular seasonal train between Boston and Cape Cod. The proposal routed the train on the Empire Corridor through New York State rather than Connecticut. In September the legislature empaneled a working group consisting of MassDOT representatives, government officials, business leaders, and involved citizens to work on the project.

MassDOT released a Berkshire Flyer feasibility study in March 2018 in which three alternatives were studied. The second option would have added a new limited-stop express train on this route, saving 10 to 12 minutes. The third would have added a new train that skipped Albany–Rensselaer by traversing the Schodack Subdivision, cutting  and saving 20 minutes. NYSDOT stated it would not support a service that did not stop at all Empire Corridor stations. The report also raised the possibility of a new Amtrak station in Chatham, New York, but this was not evaluated due to its large capital costs.

In May 2018, the Massachusetts Senate approved funds for a two-year pilot of the Berkshire Flyer. The service would be a seasonal extension of a weekend Empire Service round trip to Pittsfield. The trial was scheduled to begin in June 2020, but was delayed due to the COVID-19 pandemic and outstanding questions around the program's legal sponsorship. The pilot was rescheduled for summers 2022 and 2023. In April 2022, Amtrak announced that the first trip would depart on July 8. Tickets went up for sale on May 25, starting at $45 one way.

Service began as announced on July 8, 2022, with train 1235 departing on-time from Penn Station. Several local and state officials were aboard the first train, while others greeted it in Pittsfield. The season ended with a southbound trip on September 5, running on Labor Day instead of Sunday. Feedback on the route was positive, though many passengers desired the option to spend more time in Pittsfield, saying the limited schedule was inconvenient. Supporters hope the schedule can be expanded for the 2023 season.

Service 

As scheduled, the Berkshire Flyer departs New York Penn Station on Fridays at 3:16 PM and arrives at Joseph Scelsi Intermodal Transportation Center in Pittsfield at 7:12 PM. The reverse trip is made Sundays, departing Pittsfield at 3:00 PM and arriving at Penn Station at 7:05 PM. In Pittsfield, passengers are welcomed by "ambassadors" who provide information and assist in wayfinding.

Route details 
The Berkshire Flyer operates over CSX Transportation, Metro-North Railroad, and Amtrak trackage:

CSX Berkshire Subdivision: Pittsfield to Schodack, New York
Amtrak Post Road Branch: Schodack to Rensselaer
CSX Hudson Subdivision: Rensselaer to Poughkeepsie (leased to Amtrak)
Metro-North Railroad Hudson Line: Poughkeepsie to Spuyten Duyvil
Amtrak Empire Connection: Spuyten Duyvil to New York Penn Station

Though the Berkshire Flyer is the first and only Amtrak train to offer a direct ride between New York City and Pittsfield without layovers, all sections of the route are served by other Amtrak trains. The line between New York City and Rensselaer is part of Amtrak's Empire Corridor, while service between Rensselaer and Pittsfield is provided by the Lake Shore Limited.

Stations

References

External links 
 The Berkshire Flyer | 1Berkshires
 Berkshire Flyer – Amtrak

Amtrak routes
Passenger rail transportation in Massachusetts
Passenger rail transportation in New York (state)
Railway services introduced in 2022